Food labeling in Mexico refers to the official norm that mainly consists of placing labels on processed food sold in the country in order to help consumers make a better purchasing decision based on nutritional criteria. The system was approved in 2010 under the Norma Oficial Mexicana (NOM)  (often shortened to NOM-051). The standards, denominated as Daily Dietary Guidelines (Spanish:  or GDA), were based on the total amount of saturated fats, fats, sodium, sugars and energy or calories represented in kilocalories per package, the percentage they represented per individual portion, as well as the percentage that they would represent in a daily intake.

After its implementation, several studies were carried out to determine whether its execution was effective. The results indicated that most respondents were unaware of the recommended intakes, did not understand the meaning of the values indicated by the system, and that they did not use the system to shop. Further, when questioning undergraduate nutrition students, most were unable to interpret the system correctly. Because of this, the Secretariat of Health looked for alternatives to the system. In 2016, Chile published a simplified food labeling system, which inspired the creation of a similar system for Mexico.

In 2020, labeling standards were applied to 85% of the food products consumed in Mexico, one of the most obese countries in the world.

Development

Background

The opening to foreign food industry capital since the 1980s and the entry into force of the North American Free Trade Agreement in 1994 led to an increasing import of industrially processed foods into Mexico. Both resulted in an irreversible rupture in Mexico's eating habits and a sudden increase in obesity in the country. In the 1980s, the obesity rate was 7%. Since then, Mexico became the country with the highest consumption of processed foods in Latin America and the fourth-highest in the world.

First front-of-package labeling system

In 2010, the Secretariat of Health (SALUD) requested the establishment of a food labeling norm. After its approval, it was designed as NOM-051-SCFI/SSA1-2010 of the Norma Oficial Mexicana standards, and it was denominated as Daily Dietary Guidelines (Spanish: Guías Diarias de Alimentación or GDA), was based on the total amount of saturated fats, fats, sodium, sugars and energy represented in kilocalories per package, the percentage they represented per individual portion, as well as the percentage that they would represent in a daily intake.

The  (INSP) started in 2011 to investigate the effectiveness of the labeling system. They found that it was ineffective as most nutrition college students could not interpret it correctly. In 2016, the National Health and Nutrition Survey (ENSANUT) was performed. It included questions related to the comprehension of the GDA food labeling system, and the results determined that nationwide the surveyed people understood the system poorly. The INSP specified that 97.6% of respondents did not know the appropriate values for calorie intake in children aged 10 to 12 years; over 90% claimed not to know the daily values ​​of calories to be consumed by an adult person, as they lacked the right information to compare or decide a purchase based on the information available; and 66.4% said they never used the GDA system to base their purchases. In the same year, according to a survey by the INSP and the University of Waterloo, Ontario, 6% of the consulted adults were able to understand the GDA system.

The government of Mexico applied the 2013 National Strategy for the Prevention and Control of Overweight, Obesity and Diabetes, a series of measures by the government of Mexico aimed at combating the obesity crisis and chronic non-communicable diseases such as hypertension, diabetes or cancer. According to the document "[t]he current levels of overweight and obesity in the Mexican population represent a threat to the sustainability of our health system, due to their association with non-communicable diseases and the use of specialized resources and higher technology that impose high costs on health services for their care". The statistics indicated that 42.6% of males over 20 years were overweight and 26.8% were obese. Women in the same categories represented 35.5% and 37.5%, respectively. By 2018, 75% of adults were overweight or obese.

Second front-of-package labeling system

In 2016, the government of Chile approved the Food Labeling and Advertising Law, a regulation that uses simplified and visible warning labels that indicate the excess of calories and added nutrients and ingredients related to non-communicable diseases. Inspired by their system, the INSP decided to form a committee of national academic experts on the front-of-package labeling of food and non-alcoholic beverages in order to define a new regulation. The Secretariat of Economy (SE) and the Federal Commission for the Protection against Sanitary Risk held organized working groups which resulted in a standard draft, which was submitted for consultation from 11 October to 10 December 2019, where 5,200 comments were received. Simultaneously, civil society organizations created the Alianza por la Salud Alimentaria (Alliance for Food Health), which carried out a public campaign to inform the population about the efforts.

On 29 October 2019, reforms and additions to the Mexican General Health Law were approved, including the new front-of-package labeling model. On 27 March 2020, the Official Journal of the Federation published in the norm NOM-051-SCFI/SSA1-2010 updates that determined that all food and non-alcoholic beverage packaging and containers must display the approved seals.

Labels
The labels implemented are black octagons with white letters that seek to inform in a simple way about high amounts of sugars, energy, trans fats and saturated fats. Two rectangular legends were also included on the discouragement of the consumption of foods containing caffeine or sweeteners in children. These labels can be presented individually or in groups of labels, which will determine whether or not the product can include certain persuasive elements such as toys or rewards, or pictures of celebrities, fictional characters or cartoons on the packaging that seek to attract the attention of the underaged sector. Further, if the product has one or more seals, it cannot include endorsements from medical societies.

In addition to these seals, packaging must contain nutrition facts labels including the exact amount of sugars added to the product in the manufacturing process and the nutritional content expressed in quantities of 100 grams or 100 milliliters.

Reception

Companies
The governments of the United States, Canada, Switzerland, and the European Union—where the largest multinational food corporations in the world are based—asked Mexico through the World Trade Organization to postpone the implementation date of the front labeling. According to the note issued to Mexico, the measures were "more restrictive than necessary to meet Mexico's legitimate health objectives". The Mexican Consumer Products Industry Council (ConMéxico), which groups companies based in Mexico, asked the authorities to eliminate the new front labeling, describing it as confusing and unreliable. Among the companies that requested the postponement of the labeling were Coca-Cola, PepsiCo, Jugos del Valle and Grupo Bimbo. The latter was able to have some of its products exempted due to its own health strategy. FEMSA, Coca-Cola producer in Mexico, filed an amparo lawsuit against the labeling of their products. An amparo lawsuit filed by the National Confederation of Industrial Chambers in March 2020 was dismissed by the Mexican judiciary. The Interamerican Association for the Protection of Intellectual Property and the Mexican Association for the Protection of Intellectual Property said that food labeling was unconstitutional and violated the provisions that Mexico had signed at the international level such as the North American Free Trade Agreement. Civil society researchers pointed out the recurrence of the same argument in other countries in order to stop new labeling projects.

Organizations
Among the organizations and entities that celebrated the entry into force of the labeling were the UNICEF, the World Health Organization, the Pan American Health Organization, the National Human Rights Commission of Mexico, the main public universities of the country (the National Autonomous University of Mexico, the National Polytechnic Institute and the  Autonomous Metropolitan University), as well as the secretariats of Economy and Health of Mexico, and the System for the Integral Protection of the Rights of Children and Adolescents.

Prizes and recognitions
The World Health Organization the gave SALUD an award for the Prevention and Control of Non-communicable Diseases due to the front-of-package update.

Impact

On population
In a survey conducted a few days after the second front-of-package system was officially implemented, Food Navigator found that only 10% of respondents took them into consideration. Researches of the Obesity Data Lab agreed that the COVID-19 pandemic in the country will indirectly affect the results.

In 2020, Guadalupe López Rodríguez, nutritionist and researcher of the Autonomous University of Hidalgo State, commented that if the Chilean system is taken as a basis, the labels would have a significant impact on the population during the first stage of implementation. However, over time consumers would become accustomed to them and would cease to give them the desired importance. Cuauhtémoc Rivera, president of the Alianza Nacional de Pequeños Comerciantes (National Alliance of Small Merchants), said that consumers were initially found to avoid products with seals, but that eventually purchases normalized.

After one year in force, it was found that in some categories consumption was reduced, but there was no significant impact on sales. Jonás Murillo, vice-president of the Food, Beverages and Tobacco Commission of the Confederation of Industrial Chambers explained that consumers preferred larger versions of products with labels to smaller ones—which are healthier. In addition, it was noted that in some cases consumers preferred products with a higher number of labels against unlabeled products. Murillo also noted that the key problem of the system is that it was not applied correctly and, as an example, he compared a salad with dressing and a bottle of soft drink concluding that although their nutritional value is different, both have the same number of labels.

On companies
After its implementation, 85% of the products received a label. Despite inconclusive results, several companies (especially soft drinks and dairy companies) have modified the formulas of some products to reduce the risk amounts. In some products, the total number of labels was reduced, and in other cases companies preferred to sell an alternate version of the same product but free of labels.

See also

 List of food labeling regulations

Notes

References 

2010 establishments in Mexico
Food and drink in Mexico
Food labelling
Food law
Law of Mexico